The following is a list of albums, EPs, and mixtapes released in or scheduled for release in 2023. These albums are (1) original, i.e. excluding reissues, remasters, and compilations of previously released recordings, and (2) notable, defined as having received significant coverage from reliable sources independent of the subject.

For additional information about bands formed, reformed, disbanded, or on hiatus, for deaths of musicians, and for links to musical awards, see 2023 in music.

First quarter

January

February

March

Second quarter

April

May

June

Third quarter

July

August

September

Fourth quarter

November

Unscheduled and TBA

References 

 
2023-related lists
Lists of albums by release date